The 16th West Virginia Infantry Regiment was an infantry regiment that served in the Union Army during the American Civil War.

Service
The 16th West Virginia Infantry Regiment was organized at Washington, D.C. between August and September 1862. It spent its entire service in the defenses of Washington, D.C., and was mustered out on June 10, 1863.

Casualties
The 16th West Virginia Infantry Regiment suffered 7 enlisted men dead from disease for a total of 7 fatalities.

References

The Civil War Archive

See also
West Virginia Units in the Civil War
West Virginia in the Civil War

Units and formations of the Union Army from West Virginia
1862 establishments in Washington, D.C.
Military units and formations established in 1862
Military units and formations disestablished in 1863